Vereshchagin is a Russian masculine surname, its feminine counterpart is Vereshchagina. It may refer to:

 Pavel Vereshchagin, a character from the 1970 Soviet movie White Sun of the Desert
 Nikolai Kuzmich Vereshchagin (1908–2008), Russian zoologist who specialized in the study of mammoths and other Arctic paleofauna, grandson of the war painter Vasily Vereshchagin
 Pyotr Vereshchagin  (1834/36–1886), Russian landscape and cityscape painter
 Vasily Vereshchagin (1842–1904), Russian war painter
 The V. V. Vereshchagin Mykolaiv Art Museum
 Vasily Petrovich Vereshchagin (1835–1909), Russian portraitist, history painter and illustrator, brother of Pyotr
 Igor Vereshchagin (b. 1952), Russian music and street photographer.

See also 
 Vereshchagino

References 

Russian-language surnames